The city of Ottawa, Canada held municipal elections on December 5, 1966.

Mayor Don Reid is easily re-elected.

Mayor of Ottawa

Ottawa Board of Control
(4 elected)

City council

(2 elected from each ward)

References
Ottawa Journal, December 6, 1966

Municipal elections in Ottawa
1966 elections in Canada
1960s in Ottawa
1966 in Ontario
December 1966 events in North America